Nadiya Dusanova (born 17 November 1987 in Tashkent, Uzbekistan) is an Uzbekistani high jumper.

She competed at the 2008, 2012 and 2016 Olympic Games without reaching the final. At the 2017 Asian Athletics Championships she won the gold medal jumping 1.84 metres. She won silver medal at 2018 Asian games with 1.94 m. which is her personal best in Asian games.

Her personal best jump is 1.98 metres, achieved in July 2008 in Tashkent. At the time, this was the Asian record.

Competition record

References 

1987 births
Living people
Sportspeople from Tashkent
Uzbekistani female high jumpers
Olympic female high jumpers
Olympic athletes of Uzbekistan
Athletes (track and field) at the 2008 Summer Olympics
Athletes (track and field) at the 2012 Summer Olympics
Athletes (track and field) at the 2016 Summer Olympics
Asian Games silver medalists for Uzbekistan
Asian Games bronze medalists for Uzbekistan
Asian Games medalists in athletics (track and field)
Athletes (track and field) at the 2010 Asian Games
Athletes (track and field) at the 2014 Asian Games
Athletes (track and field) at the 2018 Asian Games
Medalists at the 2010 Asian Games
Medalists at the 2014 Asian Games
Medalists at the 2018 Asian Games
World Athletics Championships athletes for Uzbekistan
Asian Athletics Championships winners
Asian Indoor Athletics Championships winners
21st-century Uzbekistani women